Thomas Plesters is a Belgian former rower from Gent near Brussels. He was stroke of the winning Thames Challenge Cup eight in 2001. After Oscar de Somville of the Royal Club Nautique de Gand in the early nineteenth century, he was the most important Belgian (stroke) of that club in the late 20th and early 21st century.

Achievements
Henley Royal Regatta
Thames Challenge Cup Gold

External links
 Thames Challenge Cup 2001 
 Video Thames Challenge Cup Winner 2001
 Henley Royal Regatta HRR

Belgian male rowers
Flemish sportspeople
1978 births
Living people
Rowers from Ghent